Sirikot is a village in Haripur District and Ghazi Tehsil, in Pakistan's Khyber Pakhtunkhwa Province at 34°10'60N 73°43'50E. It is the principal settlement of the Union Council.

People living in Sirikot are from Mashwani Sayyid (Syed), Awan (tribe) and other indigenous Hindko speakers.

Prominent Personalities:

Syed Sabir Shah, Athar Minallah, Safdar Shah etc.

See also
Kihari

References

External links
Satellite image
Sirikot Wiki Encyclopedia

Union councils of Haripur District